The Living Reed is a historical novel by Pearl S. Buck in which life in Korea, from the latter part of the nineteenth century to the end of the Second World War, is described through the viewpoints and lives of several members of four generations of a prominent aristocratic family.

References

1963 American novels
American historical novels
Novels by Pearl S. Buck
Novels set in Korea
Novels set in the Joseon dynasty
John Day Company books